Kontomire stew is a stew made from cocoyam leaves (known in the Akan language as "kontomire"), commonly prepared in the home and very popular in Ghanaian cuisine. In Ghana, kontomire stew is served with variety of dishes, including steamed rice, cooked yam and plantain. Its English designation palava sauce is said to originate from the people of Elmina.

Ingredients 

The stew consists primarily of:

 cocoyam leaves
 palm oil
egusi
 dried fish
 fresh tomatoes
 pepper
 egg/ Egusi

See also
 List of stews

References

External links 
 Video how to prepare kontomire stew 

Ghanaian cuisine
Stews